Sir Robin Urquhart Young, KCB (born 7 September 1948) is a British retired civil servant. He was Permanent Secretary for the Department for Culture, Media and Sport from 1998 to 2001 and Permanent Secretary for the Department of Trade & Industry from 2001 to 2005.

Personal life
Young was born in 1948, and educated at Fettes College, Edinburgh and at University College, Oxford. He was appointed Knight Commander of the Order of the Bath (KCB) in the 2002 Queen's Birthday Honours.

Career
Young joined the Department of Environment where he worked on housing, environment and local government policy, later becoming Principal Private Secretary to Ministers during the 1980s. From April 1994 to June 1997 he was First Director of the Government Office for London. Between July 1997 and May 1998, he was Head of Economic and Domestic Affairs Secretariat, Cabinet Office. He was then Permanent Secretary at the Department for Culture, Media and Sport. From June 2001 to March 2005, he was Permanent Secretary at the Department of Trade & Industry.

After leaving the Civil Service in 2005, he went into business and was chairman at Dr Foster Intelligence, East of England International (EEI), Apex Communications, Circle Anglia, and A4e.

References

1948 births
Living people
Permanent Under-Secretaries of State for Culture, Media and Sport
Permanent Under-Secretaries of State for Trade and Industry
Alumni of University College, Oxford
Knights Commander of the Order of the Bath
Civil servants in the Department of the Environment
Civil servants in the Cabinet Office
Private secretaries in the British Civil Service
People educated at Fettes College